Sam Truloff (born 24 March 1993) is an Australian cricketer. He made his first-class debut for Queensland in the 2016–17 Sheffield Shield season on 26 November 2016. He made his List A debut on 23 February 2022, for Queensland in the 2021–22 Marsh One-Day Cup.

References

External links
 

1993 births
Living people
Australian cricketers
Queensland cricketers
Place of birth missing (living people)